Eupithecia agnesata is a moth in the family Geometridae first described by Taylor in 1908. It is found in North America from California through Wyoming, Oregon and Washington to British Columbia.

The wingspan is about 18 mm. The forewing ground colour is grey mixed with dark scales and black transverse lines with brown shading in the discal area. Adults are on wing from April to September.

References

agnesata
Moths of North America
Fauna of the Sierra Nevada (United States)
Moths described in 1908